The National Centre for Cancer Research (CNIO) is a Spanish research institute.

The Centre is situated on the campus of the Carlos III Health Institute in Madrid. 
María Blasco Marhuenda has been the director since 2011.

History 
The Research Center was founded in 1998 as an extension of the Carlos III Health Institute. In 2011, the Spanish Ministry of Science and Innovation granted it the Severo Ochoa Excellence Center distinction, giving the Center the status as one of the foremost research centers in Spain. This award was extended in 2015 and will remain active until 2019.

Research programs 

The CNIO integrates resources devoted to basic research as well as research directly applied to diagnosis, pharmaceutics and clinical practice. It consists of 49 research groups distributed in three basic research programs (molecular oncology, structural biology and biocomputation, and cancer cellular biology) and two applied research programs (human cancer genetics and clinical research). These programs are supported by an Area of Innovation which includes a Biotechnology program, offering advanced technological support to research programs; an Experimental Therapy Program, focused in pharmaceutical development, and an Office for Technological Transfer and Evaluation.

References

External links
 Official website

Medical research institutes in Spain
Research institutes established in 1998
Research institutes in the Community of Madrid